Trenton Municipal Airport  was a village-owned, public-use airport located one mile (2 km) northwest of the central business district of Trenton, a village in Hitchcock County, Nebraska, United States.

The airport was closed in September 2015.

Facilities and aircraft 
For the 12-month period ending September 11, 2007, the airport had 3,750 general aviation aircraft operations, an average of 10 per day.

References

External links 

Defunct airports in Nebraska
Buildings and structures in Hitchcock County, Nebraska